United Nations Security Council resolution 1404, adopted unanimously on 18 April 2002, after reaffirming Resolution 864 (1993) and all subsequent resolutions on Angola, particularly resolutions 1127 (1997), 1173 (1998), 1237 (1999), 1295 (2000), 1336 (2001), 1348 (2001) and 1374 (2001), the council extended the monitoring mechanism of sanctions against UNITA until 19 October 2002.

The security council expressed concern at the effects of the civil war on the humanitarian situation, determining that the situation remained a threat to international peace and security. It welcomed the ceasefire agreement on 4 April 2002 and declared that the monitoring mechanism would be in place as long as necessary. Acting under Chapter VII of the United Nations Charter, the council extended the monitoring mechanism for an additional period of six months and requested it to report periodically to the committee established in Resolution 864 with an additional report by 15 October 2002. The chairman of the committee was required to submit the report by 19 October 2002 to the council.

The Secretary-General Kofi Annan was asked to appoint four experts to serve on the monitoring mechanism and make financial arrangements to this effect. Finally, all countries were called upon to co-operate with the mechanism during the course of its mandate.

See also
 Angolan Civil War
 List of United Nations Security Council Resolutions 1401 to 1500 (2002–2003)

References

External links
 
Text of the Resolution at undocs.org

 1404
2002 in Angola
 1404
April 2002 events